War Department may refer to:

 War Department (United Kingdom)
 United States Department of War (1789–1947)

See also
 War Office, a former department of the British Government
 Ministry of defence
 Ministry of War
 Ministry of Defence
 Department of Defence